Fabien Foret born  in Angoulême, France, is a professional motorcycle racer currently competing in the FIM Endurance World Championship aboard a Kawasaki ZX-10R. He has spent most of his career in the Supersport World Championship.

After taking part in the French national championships for a number of years Fabien Foret moved to the Supersport World Championship in 2000. The same year he won the 24 Hours of Spa-Francorchamps, and the Bol d'Or endurance races.

In 2001 he finished 8th in the Supersport World Championship with two race wins and also finished 2nd at the 24 Hours of Le Mans and the Bol d'Or endurance races.

He won the Supersport World Championship in 2002 for Ten Kate Honda, taking four race.

He moved to the Superbike World Championship in  riding for Alstare Engineering Corona Extra  Suzuki. After a poor first half of the  season he was replaced by Max Neukirchner. He returned to the Supersport World Championship for the end of the season.

For  he joined the official Yamaha o team  managed by former Grand Prix racer Wilco Zeelenberg. He opened the year with pole position at Losail and took a win at Monza and finished fourth or better in each of the first six rounds, but a heavy crash at Brno caused him to miss several races he currently rides for Kawasaki Intermoto With Czech and Welsh technician's.

In 2015, he won the Bol d'Or with Team Kawasaki SRC.

In 2016, he won the 24 Hour Endurance Race in Le Mans with Team Kawasaki SRC.

Career statistics

Supersport World Championship

Races by year

Superbike World Championship

Races by year

References

1973 births
French motorcycle racers
Superbike World Championship riders
Supersport World Championship riders
Living people